The International Desalination Association (IDA) is a non-profit association working to promote water scarcity and solutions to other water problems.

Formation 
IDA was established in 1973 and works to develop and promote the appropriate use of desalination and desalination technology globally in; the water supply, water reuse, water pollution control, water purification, water treatment, and other water sciences and technology.The IDA does this by encouraging research, promoting and exchanging communication, disseminating information, and supporting education of desalination and water sciences. A non-profit association, IDA is associated with the United Nations as part of a growing international network of non-governmental organizations (NGOs).

Connecting the global desalination community
IDA connects the global desalination community in many ways. It serves more than 2,600 core members in 60 countries and reaches an additional 4,000 affiliate members around the world. Its membership includes scientists, utilities and other end-users, engineers, consultants, financiers, developers, researchers and students representing governments, corporations and academia.

IDA's educational resources include scholarships, the IDA Fellowship Program, Young Leaders Program and the IDA Desalination Academy. IDA's publications and online and multi-media communications provide ready access to timely industry information. Workshops and conferences held worldwide explore specific topics in-depth, and the biennial IDA World Congress is widely recognized as the premier global event for the desalination and water reuse community.

IDA is also committed to informing the public about desalination and water reuse and their critical role in providing new, reliable and sustainable sources of fresh water worldwide.

Enhancing energy efficiency and environmental responsibility
IDA advocates the development and use of desalination technologies and practices that lower costs, reduce energy requirements and enhance environmental responsibility. Our Energy Task Force is actively engaged in promoting strategies to help the industry further reduce energy requirements, while our Environmental Task Force has developed guidelines to enhance environmental stewardship in the Persian Gulf, the first region to be studied in depth.

IDA is headquartered in Topsfield, Massachusetts in the USA.

References

External links
 
 IDA World Congress 2015

Water industry
Water desalination